The 1962 Colorado State College Bears baseball team represented Colorado State College in the 1962 NCAA University Division baseball season. The Bears played their home games at Jackson Field. The team was coached by Pete Butler in his 20th year at Colorado State.

The Bears won the District VII playoff to advanced to the College World Series, where they were defeated by the Texas Longhorns.

Roster

Schedule 

! style="" | Regular Season
|- valign="top" 

|- align="center" bgcolor="#ccffcc"
| 1 || March 14 || at  || Lobo Field • Albuquerque, New Mexico || 12–6 || 1–0 || –
|- align="center" bgcolor="#ffcccc"
| 2 || March 16 || at  || UA Field • Tucson, Arizona || 5–11 || 1–1 || –
|- align="center" bgcolor="#ffcccc"
| 3 || March 17 || at Arizona || UA Field • Tucson, Arizona || 8–14 || 1–2 || –
|- align="center" bgcolor="#ffcccc"
| 4 || March 17 || at Arizona || UA Field • Tucson, Arizona || 2–4 || 1–3 || –
|- align="center" bgcolor="#ccffcc"
| 5 || March 20 || at New Mexico || Lobo Field • Albuquerque, New Mexico || 15–11 || 2–3 || –
|- align="center" bgcolor="#ffcccc"
| 6 || March 21 || at New Mexico || Lobo Field • Albuquerque, New Mexico || 7–9 || 2–4 || –
|- align="center" bgcolor="#ffcccc"
| 7 || March 28 ||  || Jackson Field • Greeley, Colorado || 1–3 || 2–5 || 4–0
|-

|- align="center" bgcolor="#ccffcc"
| 8 || April 4 ||  || Jackson Field • Greeley, Colorado || 13–0 || 3–5 || –
|- align="center" bgcolor="#ccffcc"
| 9 || April 6 ||  || Jackson Field • Greeley, Colorado || 13–2 || 4–5 || 1–0
|- align="center" bgcolor="#ccffcc"
| 10 || April 11 ||  || Jackson Field • Greeley, Colorado || 11–5 || 5–5 || 2–0
|- align="center" bgcolor="#ccffcc"
| 11 || April 13 || at Colorado Mines || Unknown • Golden, Colorado || 11–0 || 6–5 || 3–0
|- align="center" bgcolor="#ffcccc"
| 12 || April 20 ||  || Jackson Field • Greeley, Colorado || 5–13 || 6–6 || 3–0
|- align="center" bgcolor="#ffcccc"
| 13 || April 21 || at Wyoming || Unknown • Laramie, Wyoming || 2–5 || 6–7 || 3–0
|- align="center" bgcolor="#ffcccc"
| 14 || April 22 || Western State || Jackson Field • Greeley, Colorado || 3–6 || 6–8 || 3–1
|- align="center" bgcolor="#ccffcc"
| 15 || April 24 ||  Colorado State || Jackson Field • Greeley, Colorado || 7–2 || 7–8 || 3–1
|- align="center" bgcolor="#ccffcc"
| 16 || April 27 || at Western State || Unknown • Gunnison, Colorado || 21–6 || 8–8 || 4–1
|- align="center" bgcolor="#ccffcc"
| 17 || April 28 || at Western State || Unknown • Gunnison, Colorado || 10–3 || 9–8 || 5–1
|-

|- align="center" bgcolor="#ccffcc"
| 18 || May 4 || at  || Unknown • Alamosa, Colorado || 13–2 || 10–8 || 6–1
|- align="center" bgcolor="#ccffcc"
| 19 || May 5 || at Adams State || Unknown • Alamosa, Colorado || 8–2 || 11–8 || 7–1
|- align="center" bgcolor="#ccffcc"
| 20 || May 8 || at  || Unknown • Denver, Colorado || 11–5 || 12–8 || 7–1
|- align="center" bgcolor="#ccffcc"
| 21 || May 9 ||  || Jackson Field • Greeley, Colorado || 6–2 || 13–8 || 7–1
|- align="center" bgcolor="#ccffcc"
| 22 || May 10 || at  || Stewart Field • Colorado Springs, Colorado || 16–15 || 14–8 || 8–1
|- align="center" bgcolor="#ccffcc"
| 23 || May 12 || Colorado College || Jackson Field • Greeley, Colorado || 15–3 || 15–8 || 9–1
|- align="center" bgcolor="#ccffcc"
| 24 || May 15 || at Colorado State || Unknown • Fort Collins, Colorado || 5–4 || 16–8 || 9–1
|- align="center" bgcolor="#ffcccc"
| 25 || May 18 || Adams State || Jackson Field • Greeley, Colorado || 6–10 || 16–9 || 9–2
|- align="center" bgcolor="#ccffcc"
| 26 || May 19 || Adams State || Jackson Field • Greeley, Colorado || 9–3 || 17–9 || 10–2
|- align="center" bgcolor="#ccffcc"
| 27 || May 22 || Denver || Jackson Field • Greeley, Colorado || 10–3 || 18–9 || 10–2
|- align="center" bgcolor="#ccffcc"
| 28 || May 26 || at Air Force || Falcon Baseball Field • Colorado Springs, Colorado || 5–3 || 19–9 || 10–2
|-

|-
|-
! style="" | Postseason
|- valign="top"

|- align="center" bgcolor="#ccffcc"
| 29 || June 1 || Air Force || Jackson Field • Greeley, Colorado || 7–2 || 20–9 || 10–2
|- align="center" bgcolor="#ccffcc"
| 30 || June 2 || New Mexico || Jackson Field • Greeley, Colorado || 11–2 || 21–9 || 10–2
|- align="center" bgcolor="#ccffcc"
| 31 || June 4 || Air Force || Jackson Field • Greeley, Colorado || 6–5 || 22–9 || 10–2
|-

|- align="center" bgcolor="#ffcccc"
| 32 || June 11 || vs Holy Cross || Omaha Municipal Stadium • Omaha, Nebraska || 3–4 || 22–10 || 10–2
|- align="center" bgcolor="#ffcccc"
| 33 || June 12 || vs Texas || Omaha Municipal Stadium • Omaha, Nebraska || 2–12 || 22–11 || 10–2
|-

Awards and honors 
Ron Bettinger
 All-Rocky Mountain Conference Team

Eddie Dyer
 All-Rocky Mountain Conference Team

Gary Harper
 All-Rocky Mountain Conference Team

Jim Lochner
 All-Rocky Mountain Conference Team

Al Suydam
 All-Rocky Mountain Conference Team

Julie Yearling
 All-Rocky Mountain Conference Team

References 

Northern Colorado Bears baseball seasons
Colorado State College Bears baseball
College World Series seasons
Colorado State College
Rocky Mountain Athletic Conference baseball champion seasons